The streaked coleophora moth (Coleophora cratipennella) is a moth of the family Coleophoridae. It is found in the United States, including Kentucky, Pennsylvania, California, Maine and Oklahoma.

The wingspan is about 12 mm.

The larvae feed on the seeds of Juncus gerardii and possibly Polygonum punctatum. They create a trivalved, tubular silken case.

References

cratipennella
Moths described in 1864
Moths of North America